Canarium urceus is a species of sea snail, a marine gastropod mollusk in the family Strombidae, the true conchs.

Sister taxa
Canarium incisum (Wood, 1828);
Canarium anatellum (Duclos, 1844);
Canarium esculentum (Maxwell, Rymer, Congdon, Dekkers, 2020);
Canarium geelvinkbaaiensis Dekkers and Maxwell, 2020;
Canarium manintveldi Dekkers and Maxwell, 2020;
Canarium youngorum Dekkers and Maxwell, 2020;
Canarium orrae (Abbott, 1960)

Description
"The shell is elongated and fusiform and may appear biconic. The spire and bodywhorl have a distinctive rounded nodulated shoulder, that may become acute towards the anterior of the shell as the nodulation become finer, more acute and denser. The anterior canal is often well formed and acute in nature, being slightly reflected dorsally. The posterior of the bodywhorl is stained, and this staining continues to the dorsum, where it remains along the outer lip marginal fold and onto the dorsal whorl proper. The spire is always nodulated with the knobs varying from acute in some populations to more rounded and less pronounced in others. The aperture is margined in all cases with dark staining. The inner aperture with dark lirations over a rosy white base colour. The columella is midnight black, sometimes with some traces of deep plum that flush the posterior. The lirations of the columella while present, are in distinct" (Maxwell et al 2020). 

(PDF) Canarium urceus (Linné, 1758) Studies Part 1: The Recircumscription of Strombus urceus Linné, 1758 (Neostromboidae: Strombidae). Available from: https://www.researchgate.net/publication/341590804_Canarium_urceus_Linne_1758_Studies_Part_1_The_Recircumscription_of_Strombus_urceus_Linne_1758_Neostromboidae_Strombidae [accessed Apr 22 2021].

Distribution
This species is restricted to Singapore and The South China Sea (Maxwell 2020).

References

 Dautzenberg, Ph. (1929). Mollusques testaces marins de Madagascar. Faune des Colonies Francaises, Tome III
 
 
 
 Liverani V. (2014) The superfamily Stromboidea. Addenda and corrigenda. In: G.T. Poppe, K. Groh & C. Renker (eds), A conchological iconography. pp. 1-54, pls 131-164. Harxheim: Conchbooks.
 Tsi, C. Y. & Ma, S. T. (1982). A preliminary checklist of the marine gastropoda and Bivalvia (Mollusca) of Hong Kong and southern China. In: Proceedings of the first international marine biological workshop: The marine flora and fauna of Hong Kong and southern China (ed. Morton, B.), vol. 1, pp431-458. Hong Kong University Press, Hong Kong.
 Walls, J.G. (1980). Conchs, tibias and harps. A survey of the molluscan families Strombidae and Harpidae. T.F.H. Publications Ltd, Hong Kong

External links
  Linnaeus, C. (1758). Systema Naturae per regna tria naturae, secundum classes, ordines, genera, species, cum characteribus, differentiis, synonymis, locis. Editio decima, reformata [10th revised edition, vol. 1: 824 pp. Laurentius Salvius: Holmiae]
 
 

Strombidae
Gastropods described in 1758
Taxa named by Carl Linnaeus